Rachna Banerjee, also known as Rachana in the South Indian film Industry, is an Indian actress who has appeared predominantly in Bengali and Odia films along with several in Telugu, Tamil and Kannada languages. She was crowned 1990 Miss Kolkata and has won five beauty contests in India, notable being the Miss Beautiful Smile.

Bengali films

Odia films

Telugu films

Tamil films

Kannada films
She starred two movies in Kannada language with actor Ravichandran.

Hindi films

Bengali TV series

References

Actress filmographies